Linville is an unincorporated community and census-designated place (CDP) in Avery County, North Carolina, United States. It was first listed as a CDP in the 2020 census with a population of 283. Centered just south of US 221 and NC 105, the community is known as a summer mountain resort and host of the Grandfather Mountain Highland Games, the largest modern Highland games in North Carolina.

History
The community—at times known as Clay or Porcelain—was founded in 1883 and designed by Samuel T. Kelsey of Kansas, and named for William and John Linville, who were killed by Cherokees in 1766.  The East Tennessee and Western North Carolina Railroad ("Tweetsie") passed through the community from 1916 until 1940, when a major flood washed away the tracks. The old rail route later became NC 105 in 1956.

Geography
Linville is located in eastern Avery County at  (36.066389, -81.870278), in the Blue Ridge Mountains. The community is surrounded on all sides by mountains, these are: Grandmother Mountain (East), Flat Rock (Southeast), Pixie Mountain (West), Moore Mountain (Northwest), Brier Knob (North) and Grandfather Mountain (Northeast). Located east of the Eastern Continental Divide, most water drains into the Linville River, which traverses through the area, or either to Lake Kawahna (south) or Grandmother Lake (east).

Attractions
Linville has four country clubs in the area: Grandfather Golf and Country Club, Linville Land Harbor Golf Club, Linville Golf Course and Linville Ridge; all open late spring to early fall. Adjacent to Linville is Grandfather Mountain, best known for its mile-high swinging bridge, and the Blue Ridge Parkway. The Linville Historic District, located between Hickory Lane and Mitchell Avenue, features various buildings built between 1892 and 1940.

Demographics

2020 census

Note: the US Census treats Hispanic/Latino as an ethnic category. This table excludes Latinos from the racial categories and assigns them to a separate category. Hispanics/Latinos can be of any race.

Health care
Linville has one hospital, Charles A. Cannon, Jr. Memorial Hospital, that serves all of Avery County.

Notable person
 Hugh Morton, a photographer and nature conservationist who developed Grandfather Mountain

References

External links
 Charles A. Cannon Jr. Memorial Hospital
 Eseeola Lodge
 Grandfather Golf and Country Club
 Linville Ridge
Linville Land Harbor Golf Club

Census-designated places in North Carolina
Unincorporated communities in North Carolina
Unincorporated communities in Avery County, North Carolina
Populated places established in 1883